Highmark is an American non-profit healthcare company and Integrated Delivery Network based in Pittsburgh, Pennsylvania, United States. It is a large individual not-for-profit health insurer in the United States, which operates several for-profit subsidiaries.

Locality 
It is a health insurer in Pennsylvania, and through a purchase in 1996, an insurer in West Virginia and also later Delaware. As Highmark Blue Cross Blue Shield, it is primarily available in 29 counties of western Pennsylvania.  As Highmark Blue Shield, it is available in 21 counties in Central Pennsylvania and the Lehigh Valley. It also has a presence in the border areas of eastern Ohio, and all of West Virginia through its subsidiary, Highmark Blue Cross Blue Shield West Virginia.

Highmark acquired Blue Cross of Northeastern Pennsylvania, BCNEPA, in June 2015.

Company history
Highmark was created in 1977 and in the 1990s by the consolidation of two Pennsylvania licensees of the Blue Cross and Blue Shield Association — Pennsylvania Blue Shield (now Highmark Blue Shield) based in suburban Harrisburg, and Blue Cross of Western Pennsylvania based in downtown Pittsburgh (now Highmark Blue Cross/Blue Shield).  
The consolidated group is available in 62 of the state's 67 counties. In West Virginia, the company operates as Highmark Blue Cross Blue Shield West Virginia, and in Delaware, it operates as Highmark Blue Cross Blue Shield Delaware.  The new company based its head offices in downtown Pittsburgh.

On March 28, 2007, Highmark announced it intended to consolidate with Independence Blue Cross of Philadelphia.  The combination of the 2 insurers would have created a new company with over 18,000 employees, dual-headquarters in both Pittsburgh and Philadelphia and an economic impact of over $4 billion throughout the Commonwealth of Pennsylvania. On January 22, 2009, Highmark and Independence Blue Cross withdrew their applications to consolidate due to the unacceptability of conditions that the Pennsylvania Insurance Department was going to place upon the merger: to give up either of their well-known "Blue Cross" or "Blue Shield" trademarks.

In 2011 the company announced it would buy the financially troubled West Penn Allegheny Health System (WPAHS) for about $500 million, expanding from insurance into owning hospitals. This began a period of conflict between Highmark and UPMC, which had expanded from hospitals into insurance, and caused difficulties for patients to access care at the conflicting institutions. The conflict included a lawsuit by Highmark against UPMC alleging that UPMC over-billed it by $300 million for cancer drugs, arbitrators ordered Highmark to pay $188 million.

In 2014, a gay couple criticized Highmark for not providing family coverage to same-sex couples under the Affordable Care Act. Highmark later reversed their policy.

In January 2020, the company earned distinction as "Best Place to Work for LGBTQ Equality" from the Human Rights Campaign Foundation, receiving a perfect score of 100 points in the national Corporate Equality Index.

In 2021, Highmark acquired HealthNow, which operated BlueCross BlueShield in Western New York and Northeastern New York.

Organizational structure
Highmark Inc. has several wholly owned for-profit subsidiaries: United Concordia Companies, Inc., a dental insurer; Davis Vision, a provider of managed care vision benefits; Visionworks of America, a vision retail provider offering frames, lens and accessories; and HM Insurance Group, a reinsurer providing stop-loss, limited benefit medical plans, worksite, life, disability, and administrative services.
 Highmark Health Plan aka Highmark Inc
 Highmark Blue Cross Blue Shield (Western PA)
 Highmark Blue Shield (Central PA)
 Highmark Blue Cross Blue Shield West Virginia
 Highmark Blue Cross Blue Shield Delaware
 Highmark Health Options (Delaware)
Allegheny Health Network
Allegheny General Hospital
Allegheny Valley Hospital
Canonsburg Hospital
Forbes Regional Hospital
Grove City Medical Center 
Jefferson Hospital
Saint Vincent Hospital 
Western Pennsylvania Hospital
Westfield (NY) Memorial Hospital
Wexford Hospital 
 Diversified Businesses
 United Concordia (Dental)
 HM Insurance Group (Health-related Insurance)
 HM Health Solutions (IT Services)
 The Highmark Foundation
 HM Home and Community Services

References

External links

Blue Cross Blue Shield
HM Health Solutions

American companies established in 1977
Health care companies established in 1977
Financial services companies established in 1977
Privately held companies based in Pennsylvania
Health care companies based in Pennsylvania
Healthcare in Pittsburgh
Health insurance in the United States
Companies based in Pittsburgh
Members of Blue Cross Blue Shield Association
1977 establishments in Pennsylvania
Medical and health organizations based in Pennsylvania